Malacothamnus jonesii is a species of flowering plant in the mallow family known by the common names Jones' bushmallow and slender bushmallow.

Description
Malacothamnus jonesii is an erect shrub with a slender branching stem reaching two meters or more in height. It is coated densely in velvety white hairs, appearing feltlike. The thin, gray-green leaves are several centimeters long. The inflorescence is a loose cluster of a few pale pink flowers with narrow petals each under a centimeter long.

Distribution
Malacothamnus jonesii is endemic to California, where it grows in the chaparral and woodland of the California Coast Ranges in Monterey and San Luis Obispo Counties.

External links
Jepson Manual Treatment: Malacothamnus jonesii
USDA Plants Profile: Malacothamnus jonesii
Malacothamnus jonesii Photo gallery

jonesii
Endemic flora of California
Natural history of the California chaparral and woodlands
Natural history of the California Coast Ranges
Natural history of Monterey County, California
Natural history of San Luis Obispo County, California
Flora without expected TNC conservation status